Jezabel is a Brazilian television series produced by RecordTV in partnership with the production company Formata Produções that premiered on 23 April 2019 and ended 12 August 2019. It is based on the story of biblical character Jezebel. The series stars Lidi Lisboa as the titular character.

Plot 
After an agreement between two kingdoms, a disguised Jezabel marries Prince Acabe and becomes the most dangerous queen of Israel. Taking advantage of the weak and submissive profile of her husband, she starts to rule the kingdom with violence and manipulates everyone around her, calling herself a great priestess and divine spokesman, in addition to resorting to violence and public sacrifices to show her power. She has allies including her lover Hannibal and her best friend, Thanit, a vain and ambitious woman, who influences Jezebel with more barbaric plans. The queen's greatest enemy is the prophet Elias, who attempts to unmask her and remove the queen from power with the help of various allies. This causes Jezabel to hire the nymphet Dido to seduce Eliseu, disciple of Elias, to discover his plans. Also in the fight against the queen is Obadias, administrator of the palace who works as a spy and tries to hide the prophets.

Cast

Main 
 Lidi Lisboa as Jezabel, Rainha de Israel
 André Bankoff as Acabe, King of Israel
 Mônica Carvalho as Thanit
 Iano Salomão as Elias
 Juan Alba as Obadias Rakesh
 Ronny Kriwat as Eliseu Yak
 Juliana Xavier as Dido
 Juliana Knust as Queila
 Timóteo Heiderick as Barzilai
 Rafael Sardão as Hannibal
 Sthefany Brito as Raquel Palhoça
 Guilherme Dellorto as Micaías
 Alexandre Slaviero as Baltazar
 Bernardo Velasco as Matheus
 Leonardo Miggiorin as Isaac
 Adriana Birolli as Aisha 
 Hylka Maria as Getúlia
 Flávio Galvão as Nabote Vina
 Eduardo Lago as Phineas Yak
 Narjara Turetta as Dalila Yak
 Juliana Boller as Hannah Yak
 Victor Sparapane as Tadeu Vina
 Daniel Blanco as Abner Vina
 Henri Pagnocelli as Emanuel Palhoça
 Andréa Avancini as Yarin Palhoça
 Brendha Haddad as Anaid
 Juliana Schalch as Temina
 Daniel Erthal as Thiago
 Dudu Pelizzari as Kaleb
 Léo Cidade as Levi
 Bárbara Maia as Leah
 Ricardo Pavão as Pigmaleão
 Fernando Sampaio as Uriel
 Igor Cosso as Miguel
 Laís Pinho as Samira Rakesh
 Camila Mayrink as Joana Rakesh
 Fernanda Nizzato as Adama
 Pedro Lamin as Sidônio
 Aline Prado as Batnoam
 Alex Brasil as Jarbas
 André Bicudo as Yakir
 João Pedro Novaes as Adad
 Gabriel Felipe as Ezri
 Fábio Scalon as Ib
 Luckas Moura as Noam
 Willian Mello as Samuel

Guest stars
 Samara Felippo as Tany
 Talita Castro as Rebeca
 Beth Zalcman as Elza Vina
 Gutto Ordoz as Benyamin
 Andrey Lopes as Dov
 Armando Amaral as Gilad
 Cassio do Nascimento as Cadmo
 Edu Porto as Jaali
 Luciano Quirino as Etbaal
 Mario Hermeto as Joel
 Patrick D'Orlando as Tobias

Ratings

References

External links 
 

2019 telenovelas
Brazilian television series
Brazilian telenovelas
RecordTV telenovelas
2019 Brazilian television series debuts
2019 Brazilian television series endings
Portuguese-language telenovelas
Television series based on the Bible